Herlev is a suburb about 9 km northwest of Copenhagen city centre. It is the site of the municipal council of Herlev Municipality, Denmark.

Sports  

Herlev is the hometown of former Vancouver Canuck Jannik Hansen.

Herlev is known for its hockey team, the Herlev Hornets.

Attractions 

It is famous for being Denmark's tallest building and the fifth tallest hospital in the world. Its modern, functional architecture in bright concrete, glass and bronze-coloured aluminium gives a unique impression. Construction began in 1965 and the hospital was finished in 1975. It was opened in 1976. In 2021, the new emergency room and paediatric centre were opened by Crown Princess Mary, the Danish Minister of Health Magnus Heunicke, and Sophie Hæstorp Andersen, chairman of the Region Hovedstaden.

Herlev has several small, independent museums placed around the city.

Transport 

Herlev train station serves the central part of Herlev. Local buses from the bus terminal outside the train station provide connections to more remote areas of the municipality.

Notable people 
 Lars Lilholt (born 1953) a Danish singer, violinist, guitarist and composer
 Anita Lerche (born 1973) a singer-songwriter, composer and actress, grew up in Herlev
 Niclas Genckel Petersen (born 1980) and Jannik Brandt Thomsen make up Nik & Jay, a Danish hip-hop/pop duo
 Mette Lindberg (born 1983) a Danish vocalist, part of The Asteroids Galaxy Tour, a psychedelic pop group.

Sport 
 Kim Staal (born 1978) a Danish former ice hockey forward, who last played with Herlev Eagles
 Thor Dresler (born 1979) a Danish former ice hockey player and current ice hockey coach
 Dennis Sørensen (born 1981) a retired Danish footballer with over 350 club caps 
 Kenneth Hansen (born 1987) a motorcycle speedway rider
 Anders Randrup (born 1988) a Danish footballer with over 250 club caps  
 Mike Jensen (born 1988) a Danish footballer with over 340 club caps and five for Denmark
 Pernille Blume (born 1994) a Danish swimmer, gold medallist in women's 50 m freestyle at the 2016 Summer Olympics

References

External links

Municipal seats in the Capital Region of Denmark
Municipal seats of Denmark
Copenhagen metropolitan area
Cities and towns in the Capital Region of Denmark
Herlev Municipality